Barkuh  may refer to:
 Bar Kuh, South Khorasan Province
 Barkuh, Fars
 Barkuh, Kerman
 Barkuh Rural District